The Circassian genocide, or Tsitsekun, was the Russian Empire's systematic mass murder, ethnic cleansing, and expulsion of 80–97% of the Circassian population, around 800,000–1,500,000 people, during and after the Russo-Circassian War (1763–1864). The peoples planned for removal were mainly the Circassians, but other Muslim peoples of the Caucasus were also affected. Several methods used by Russian forces such as impaling and tearing the bellies of pregnant women were reported. Russian generals such as Grigory Zass described the Circassians as "subhuman filth", and glorified the mass murder of Circassian civilians, justified their use in scientific experiments, and allowed their soldiers to rape women.

During the Russo-Circassian War, the Russian Empire employed a genocidal strategy of massacring Circassian civilians. Only a small percentage who accepted Russification and resettlement within the Russian Empire were completely spared. The remaining Circassian population who refused were variously dispersed or killed en masse. Circassian villages would be located and burnt, systematically starved, or their entire population massacred. Leo Tolstoy reported that Russian soldiers would attack village houses at night. William Palgrave, a British diplomat who witnessed the events, adds that "their only crime was not being Russian". In 1864, "A Petition from Circassian leaders to Her Majesty Queen Victoria" was signed by the Circassians requesting humanitarian aid from the British Empire. In the same year, mass deportation was launched against the surviving population before the end of the war in 1864 and it was mostly completed by 1867. Some died from epidemics or starvation among the crowds of deportees and were reportedly eaten by dogs after their death. Others died when the ships underway sank during storms.

Calculations, including taking into account the Russian government's own archival figures, have estimated a loss of 80–97% of the Circassian population in the process. The displaced people were settled primarily to the Ottoman Empire. Sources state that as many as 1 to 1.5 million Circassians were forced to flee in total, but only half could make it to land. Ottoman archives show nearly 1 million migrants entering their land from the Caucasus by 1879, with nearly half of them dying on the shores as a result of diseases. If Ottoman archives are correct, it would make it the biggest genocide of the 19th century, and indeed, in support of the Ottoman archives, the Russian census of 1897 records only 150,000 Circassians, one tenth of the original number, still remaining in the now-conquered region.

, Georgia was the only country to recognize the Circassian genocide. Russia actively denies the Circassian genocide, and classifies the events as a migration. Some Russian nationalists in the Caucasus region continue to celebrate the day when the Circassian deportation was launched, 21 May (O.S), each year as a "holy conquest day". Circassians commemorate 21 May every year as the Circassian Day of Mourning commemorating the Circassian genocide. On 21 May, Circassians all over the world protest against the Russian government, especially in cities with large Circassian populations such as Kayseri and Amman, as well as other large cities such as Istanbul.

Background 

In the late 18th and early 19th centuries, although it was already making attempts in the early 18th century, the Russian Empire began actively seeking to expand its territory to the south at the expense of the neighboring Ottoman Empire and Qajar Iran, and thus aimed to incorporate the Caucasus into its domain. Some areas proved easier to incorporate than others, largely depending on the nature of local political structures. Eastern Georgia for example, comprising the most powerful and dominant Georgian regions of Kartli and Kakheti had been under intermittent Iranian suzerainty since 1555. Russia eventually found itself able, through instability in the geopolitical situation of Georgia within Qajar Iran, to annex eastern Georgia in the early 19th century, ratified in the 1803 Treaty of Gulistan.

Russia endeavored to bring the entire Caucasus region under its control, conquering Armenia, Caucasian Azerbaijan, and southern Dagestan, while co-opting the nobility of other areas such as Lower Kabardia and parts of Dagestan. Although the Russians faced considerable resistance to incorporation in Dagestan and Georgia, as well as military resistance by the local government of Imereti, the regions they felt most difficult of all to incorporate were those that had not been conquered by foreign empires and did not have any local monopolies of power—which was the state of most Circassian territories, where resistance to absorption into the Russian Empire was most tenacious.

Genocide

Start of conflicts with Circassia 

Circassians, Christianised through Byzantine influence between the 5th and 6th centuries, were generally allied with Georgians, and both Georgians and Circassians wanted to retain good relations with the Russians. Although there had previously been a small Muslim presence in Circassia, significant conversions came after 1717, when Sultan Murad IV ordered the Crimeans to spread Islam among the Circassians, with the Ottomans seeing success in converting members of the aristocracy who would then ultimately spread the religion to their dependents; Islam gained much more ground later as conversion came to be used to cement defensive alliances to protect their independence against Russian expansion.

During the reign of Catherine II the Russian army started entering Circassian soil and erecting forts, in an attempt to quickly annex Circassia. In 1763, Russian forces occupied the town of Mezdeug (modern-day Mozdok) in Eastern Circassia, turning it into a Russian fortress. Thus began the first hostilities between Circassians and the Russian Empire.

In 1764, Circassian prince Misost Bematiqwa started the Circassian resistance in Eastern Circassia. Bematiqwa's resistance was strengthened when on October 18, 1768, the Ottoman sultan, who had declared war on Russia, sent a letter to Bematiqwa stating that he, as caliph, ordered all Muslim peoples of the Caucasus to officially make war against Russia. The Ottoman Empire lost its protector status with the Crimean Khanate with the 1774 Treaty of Küçük Kaynarca. Following these events, Russian presence in the region increased, and the Circassians requested help and alliance from the Ottomans.

The Russians introduced courts in Kabarda (Eastern Circassia) in the early 1790s and declared that the Adyghe Xabze, the Circassian law, has been removed, greatly angering Circassians.

Methods of massacre 
In 1799, Russian general Fyodor Bursak organized several raids against the Western Circassians, and ordered his men to burn Circassian villages, including those loyal to the Russian Empire. From 1802 to 1806, General Pavel Tsitsianov led campaigns in Circassia and targeted Circassian villages. He referred to the Circassians as "untrustworthy swine" to "show how insignificant they are compared to Russia".

In 1805, a plague struck Kabardia. Using this as an excuse, General Glazenap ordered his forces to burn down 80 villages to terrorize the people into submission and to wreak vengeance upon the Kabardians.

A village burning campaign started, in which the Circassian population were burnt without separation. First, the Russian army would enter and loot a Circassian village, then they would kill those who resist or complain, and finally, they would set fire to the village and make sure all inhabitants were killed. In 1810 about 200 villages were burned. Between 1805 and 1807, General Bulgakov's army alone burned more than 280 villages. The population of Kabarda, which was 350,000 in 1763, was only 37,000 in 1817.

In 1808, a Russian commission decided that in order to end Circassian resistance against the Russian Empire, the Circassians would need to be completely eliminated from their homeland. In February 1810, General Fyodor Bursak's forces entered a Circassian village near the Sop River and proceeded to burn the village. They decided to postpone their plans to attack the next village when the river began to overflow. In December, the same methods were applied in the Shapsug region, and several villages were burnt. After some civilians deserted to the forests, forests in the region were burnt down. In 1811, petitions were sent to St. Petersburg in Russia, appealing for the basic rights of Circassians in the occupied areas.

In 1817, Russian veteran general Aleksey Yermolov arrived in the Caucasus. Deciding that Circassians would not surrender willingly, General Yermolov concluded that "terror" as an official strategy would be effective. Although terror methods were already in use, they were only officialized after Yermolov's orders. Russian generals began to destroy Circassian villages and towns and slaughter people as part of an official duty to shock the population into surrender. Under Yermolov, Russian troops retaliated by destroying villages where resistance fighters were thought to hide, as well as employing assassinations, kidnappings and the execution of whole families. Because the resistance was relying on sympathetic villages for food, the Russian military also systematically destroyed crops and livestock and killed Circassian civilian farmers. Circassians responded by creating a tribal federation encompassing all tribes of the area.

In May 1818, the village of Tram was surrounded, burnt, and its inhabitants killed by Russian forces under the command of General Ivan Petrovich Delpotso, who took orders from Yermolov and who then wrote to the Circassian forces:

The complete destruction of villages with everything within them became a standard action by the Russian army and Cossack units. Nevertheless, the Circassian resistance continued. Villages that had previously accepted Russian rule were found resisting again, much to the ire of Russian commanders.

In September 1820, Russian forces began to forcibly resettle inhabitants of Eastern Circassia. Military forces were sent into Kabardia, killing cattle and causing large numbers of inhabitants to flee into the mountains, with the land these inhabitants had once lived on being acquired for the Kuban Cossacks. The entirety of Kabardia (Eastern Circassia) was then declared property of the Russian government.

General Yermolov accelerated his efforts in Kabardia, with the month of March 1822 alone seeing 14 villages being destroyed as Yermolov led expeditions. In February 1824, the Russian army led by General Vlasov attacked the Circassian villages of Jambut, Aslan, Morza, and Tsab Dadhika and completely destroyed them, along with the inhabitants, despite the villages being at peace with the Russian Empire. In 1828, General Emanuel destroyed 6 Natukhaj Circassian villages and many more Shapsug Circassian villages. He then passed the Kuban and burned 210 more villages.

The Treaty of Adrianople was signed on 14 September 1829. According to the document, Circassia was given by the Ottoman Empire to Russia. The Circassians considered it invalid, arguing that because their territory had been independent of the Ottomans, Istanbul had no right to cede it. Circassian ambassadors were sent to England, France and Ottoman lands announcing that they denied the treaty under all conditions.

In 1831, the Russian government considered the destruction of the Natukhaj tribe in favor of populating their land on the northern coast of the Black Sea with Cossacks. In late 1831, in retaliation for Circassian attacks against Cossack military bases, Russian General Frolov and his task force destroyed several villages. Beginning the night of November 20, a "horror campaign" was started, in which villages were surrounded by artillery and bombarded. The targets were local homes, as well as mosques. The operation was described in a report:

In another report, General Rosen described how, in December 1831, 381 Circassians were captured by his forces and boasted about taking them prisoner and firing at villages, leaving 100 men and 50 women dead. He goes on to detail how when setting fire to a village, a Russian soldier named Midvideiv killed a Circassian who tried to stop him from burning down a mosque.

The Russians countered the heavy Circassian resistance by modifying the terrain. They laid down a network of roads and cleared the forests around these roads, destroyed native villages, and often settled new farming communities of Russians or other Orthodox Slavic people. In this increasingly bloody situation, the wholesale destruction of villages became a standard tactic.

General Yermolov remarked that "We need the Circassian lands, but we don't have any need of the Circassians themselves". Russian military commanders, such as Yermolov and Bulgakov, acting in their own interests to attain glory on the battlefield and riches through conquest, which would be much more difficult to attain on the Western front than in the Caucasus, often deceived the central administration and obscured the attempts of Circassian groups to establish peace with Russia.

In 1833, Colonel Grigory Zass was appointed commander of a part of the Kuban Military Line with headquarters in the Batalpashinsk fortress. Colonel Zass received wide authority to act as he saw fit. He was a racist who considered Circassians to be inferior. The only way to deal with the Circassians, in his opinion, was to scare them away "just like wild animals". Zass advocated ruthless military methods predicated on this notion, including burning people alive, cutting off heads with show, burning populated villages to the ground, spreading epidemics on purpose, and mass rape of children. He kept a box under his bed with his collection of severed Circassian body parts. He operated on all areas of Circassia.

Zass' main strategy was to intercept and retain the initiative, terrorize the Circassians, and destroy Circassian settlements. After a victory, he would usually burn several villages and seize cattle and horses to show off, acts which he proudly admitted. In his reports, he frequently boasted about the destruction of villages and glorified the mass murder of civilians.

In August 1833, Zass led his first expedition into Circassian territory, with the goal being destroying as many villages and towns as possible. He attacked the Besleney region between November and December, destroying most villages, including the village of the double agent Aytech Qanoqo. He continued to exterminate the Circassian population between 1834 and 1835, particularly in the Abdzakh, Besleney, Shapsug, and Kabardian regions. Zass' forces referred to all Circassian elderly, children women and men as "savages", "bandits", "plunderers" or "thieves" and the Russian Empire's forces were commanded by officers who commanded political dissidents and criminals.

In 1834, Zass sent a report to Rosen detailing his campaign into Circassia. He talks about how he killed three Circassian civilians on their way to fetch grass:

He then talks about how he destroyed a neighborhood:

Reportedly, Zass would pick random Circassian males from the towns he attacked and burn them alive as a form of entertainment. He did not stop at burning women; he also cut the pregnant women's bellies with a bayonet. He sent severed Circassian heads to friends in Berlin who were professors and used them to study anatomy. The Decembrist Nikolai Ivanovich Lorer said that Zass cleaned and boiled the flesh off the heads after storing them under his bed in his tent. He also had Circassian heads outside of his tent impaled on lances on a hill. Circassian men's corpses were decapitated by Russian-Cossack women on the battlefield after the battles were over for the heads to be sent to Zass for collection.

Zass erected Circassian heads on poles outside of his tent, and witnesses reported seeing wind blowing the beards. Russian soldiers and Cossacks were paid for sending Circassian heads to General Zass. Besides cutting Circassian heads off and collecting them, Zass employed a deliberate strategy of annihilating Circassians en masse, burning entire Circassian villages with the people in them and encouraging violation of Circassian women and children. Zass is depicted as the Devil or Satan in Circassian folklore. In 1842, Zass was removed from service due to his methods being deemed too cruel by St. Petersburg.

In 1837, some Circassian leaders offered the Russians a white peace, arguing that no more blood should be shed. In response to this offer, the Russian army under the command of General Yermolov burnt 36 Circassian villages.

In the negotiations to formulate the 1856 Treaty of Paris, the British representative, the Earl of Clarendon, defended the Circassians' rights, but was thwarted. The final treaty also extended amnesty to nationals that had fought for enemy powers, but since Circassia had never previously been under Russian control, Circassians were exempt, and thus Circassians were now placed under de jure Russian sovereignty by the treaty, with Russia under no compulsion to grant Circassians the same rights as Russian citizens elsewhere, effectively making them Russian property with which Russia could do whatever it wanted.

According to Ivan Drozdov, for the most part, the Russian army preferred to indiscriminately destroy areas where Circassians resided. In September 1862, after attacking a Circassian village and seeing some of its inhabitants flee into the forest, General Yevdokimov bombarded that forest for six hours and ordered his men to kill on sight; he then set the forest on fire to make sure no survivors were left. Drozdov reported to have overheard Circassian men taking vows to sacrifice themselves to the cannons to allow their family and rest of their villages to escape, and later more reports of groups of Circassians doing so were received.

Leo Tolstoy reported that Russian soldiers would attack village houses at night. William Palgrave, a British diplomat who witnessed the events, adds that "their only crime was not being Russian".

Final stages and expulsion 

In 1857, Dmitry Milyutin published the idea of mass expulsions of Circassian natives. Milyutin argued that the goal was not to simply move them so that their land could be settled by productive farmers, but rather that "eliminating the Circassians was to be an end in itself – to cleanse the land of hostile elements". Tsar Alexander II endorsed the plans, and Milyutin later would become the minister of war in 1861, and from the early 1860s expulsions began occurring in the Caucasus.

Others among the Russian military class such as Rostislav Fadeyev expressed views that the Circassians were unable to become Russian as a "re-education of a people is a centuries-long process" and that Russia was at a pivotal moment in its history toward pacifying the Caucasus. Fadeyev supported the extermination of half the population, stating that Russians intended to "exterminate half the Circassian people in order to compel the other half to lay down their arms". Sentiments for expulsion existed among prominent Russian politicians such as Prince Kochubei. Kochubei said to Americans visiting the region that "these Circassians are just like your American Indians – as untamable and uncivilized ... and, owning to their natural energy of character, extermination only would keep them quiet."

As Russian armies advanced in Circassia in the late 1850s and early 1860s, Circassians were evicted from their lands so they could be settled by loyal Cossacks as the Russian military elite developed a belief that Circassians would have to be entirely expelled from regions for the security of Russian rule. Yermolov wrote that "resettlement of intractable mountaineers" to Turkey would be the easiest way to "give freedom" to those who "prefer death to allegiance to the Russian government". The Circassian resettlement plan was eventually agreed upon at a meeting of the Russian Caucasus commanders in October 1860 in Vladikavkaz and officially approved on 10 May 1862 by Tsar Alexander II and a flood of refugee movements began as Russian troops advanced in their final campaign.

Although the order given by Tsar Alexander II was to deport the Circassians rather than to massacre them, the Russian commanders instead preferred the idea of massacring large portions of the Circassian population. Richmond has noted that "reports abound" of massacres in the final stages of the Caucasus campaign.

In 1859, three years before the approval of the plan by the Russian government, Russian officials began talks with the Ottomans about the migration of a limited number of emigrants, and in 1860 the two sides negotiated a treaty for the migration of 40,000–50,000 Circassians, with the Ottoman side being eager for an increase in population. However, Russia did not aim to limit the number of exilees to 50,000, as the plan was to exile the entire Circassian population.

With a gathering sense of emergency, on 25 June 1861, leaders of all the Circassian tribes gathered in Sochi to jointly petition the Western powers for help. Ottoman and British delegations both promised recognition of an independent Circassia, as well as recognition from Paris, if they unified into a coherent state, and in response the Circassian tribes formed a national parliament in Sochi, but Russian General Kolyobakin quickly overran Sochi and destroyed it, while there was no action to stop this by any major power's government.

In April 1862, a group of Russian soldiers slaughtered hundreds of Circassians who had run out of ammunition, leaving "the mountain covered with corpses of bayoneted enemies", as reported by Ivan Drozdov.

By the fall of 1863, Russian operations had become methodical, following a formula by which, after the Circassians fled into the woods, their village and any food that could be found would be burned, then after a week or two they would search for and destroy any huts the Circassians might have made for shelter, burn the forest, and then this process would be repeated until General Yevdokimov was satisfied that all the natives in the area had died either by being shot, starved, or burned.

In the southeast, Circassians prepared to resist and hold their last stand against Russian military advances and troops. With the refusal to surrender, Circassian tribes were targeted one by one by the Russian military, with thousands massacred and whole villages razed to the ground.

On April 9, 1864, "A Petition from Circassian leaders to Her Majesty Queen Victoria" was signed by the Circassians. The document requested British military aid, or at least humanitarian aid, for the Circassian people. It reads:

In 1864, in the valley of Khodz near Maikop, the Ubykh population resisted Russian troops. During the battle, the men were joined by women, who disposed of their jewellery into the river and took up arms into a fight to the end. Russians troops with heavy artillery and other modern weaponry killed all the men, women and children, in a scene that a Circassian chronicler who had witnessed the events described as "a sea of blood".

In March 1864, a surrounded Circassian army refused to surrender and committed mass suicide. Around the same time, a final battle took place in Qbaada in 1864 between the Circassian army of 20,000 men and women, consisting of local villagers and militia and a Russian army of 100,000 men, consisting of Cossack and Russian horsemen, infantry and artillery. The Circassians were defeated, and after the battle, masses of Circassians were driven to Sochi, where thousands died as they awaited deportation.

The last Circassian resistance, along with the coastal Abkhaz tribes of Pskhu, Akhtsipsou, Aibgo and Jigit were defeated and then killed en masse to the last man, woman and child, after which, on 21 May, Prince Mikhail Nikolayevich gathered the troops in a clearing in the area for a thanksgiving service. The Russian army began celebrating victory, as a military-religious parade was held, and 100 Circassian warriors were publicly mutilated in a public execution in order to establish authority. After this, the Russian army began increasing their efforts in raiding and burning Circassian villages, destroying fields to prevent return, cutting down trees, and driving the people to the Black Sea coast.

The Ottomans hoped to increase the proportion of Muslims in regions where there were large Christian populations. Mountaineers were invited to "go to Turkey, where the Ottoman government would accept them with open arms and where their life would be incomparably better".

General Yevdokimov was entrusted with enforcing the Russian policy of mass Circassian migration to other parts of the Russian Empire or the Ottoman Empire. Although some Circassians went by land to the Ottoman Empire, the majority went by sea, and those tribes which had "chosen" deportation were marched to the ports along the Black Sea by Russian forces. Russian commanders and governors warned that if the order to leave was not carried out, more forces would be sent.

Conditions during the deportation process 
The situation of the Circassian and Abkhaz masses that had been driven into the coastal gorges prior to transport was dire. A Russian historian of the time, Adolph Petrovich Berzhe, who witnessed the events regarding the departure of the Circassians described the following:

Ivan Drozdov, a Russian officer who witnessed the scene in May 1864 as the other Russians were celebrating their victory remarked:

An unknown number of deportees perished during the process. Some died from epidemics among crowds of deportees both while awaiting departure and while languishing in their Ottoman Black Sea ports of arrival. Others perished when ships underway sank during storms or due to cases where profit-minded transporters overloaded their ships to maximize profit. To pay for the voyage, Circassians sometimes were forced to sell their cattle, belongings, or even themselves into slavery.

The operation was not done with any degree of efficiency by the Russians, forcing the Circassians typically to leave using unchartered vessels, thus opening themselves up to abuses by the captains of such vessels. In some cases as many as 1,800 refugees were packed into one ship, which would also carry livestock and household possessions. When the ships did not sink, such crowded environments proved suitable for the spread of diseases and dehydration, and when the ships arrived at their destinations, they contained only remnants of their original human cargo. For this reason, they were referred to by contemporary observers as "floating graveyards" with "decks swarming with the dead and dying".

Abuses in the transport of refugees between Turkish cities were also noted, with one particular incident concerning a ship bound for Cyprus in which mutilated and decapitated bodies were found washed ashore, compounded by accounts of refugees being tied up and tossed overboard while still alive. On this particular Cyprus-bound ship, only one third of the refugees who had boarded survived. Another Russian observer, Olshevsky, also noted abuses by Turkish skippers, as well as bribes paid by Circassians to get onto departing ships, but he blamed most of all the Russian command under Yevdokimov for the situation:

Despite the conditions, Russian forces under Yevdokimov kept driving Circassians to the coast. In January he annihilated Ubykh villages, leaving the Ubykhs without shelter in the severe winter, and in March, the crowd of refugees at the Circassian port of Tuapse approached twenty thousand.

Only a portion of those who had left the Circassian coast actually made it to Ottoman ports. Of the portion that made it to Ottoman shores, many more would die there soon after while were quarantined on either beach, the vessels that had carried them, or in lazarettos, and many more died in makeshift accommodations or in the process of being transported a second time to their final destinations. One British eyewitness recalled that:

In 1864, the Ottoman Porte repeatedly asked the Russian government to stop the deportations on humanitarian grounds, in light of the human disaster unfolding on their shores, but the Ottoman requests were repeatedly refused, as Yevdokimov argued with urgency that the deportations should instead be accelerated. When October 1864 was chosen as a cutoff point for the departures, Yevdokimov successfully postponed it two weeks, after which he ignored the deadline and deported Circassians without stop, even as winter set in again. Later in 1867, Grand Prince Mikhail Nikolaevich stated that the cleansing had had to be accelerated "in light of a possible European coalition".

Transport vessels 
As Russia made it clear that it would not try hard to keep deported Circassians alive, and provide few ships for the effort, the Ottomans sent their navy to carry the Circassians. As the deportations increased, there were not enough Ottoman vessels to carry all the deportees, even when warships were recruited for the job, and the situation began taking a heavy toll on the Ottoman treasury, as it bore the brunt of the cost.

Initially, on 17 May 1863, Tsar Alexander II ruled that those who "chose" to emigrate should pay their own way. Later, the Russians offered financial incentives for vessels to take the Circassians to Ottoman ports, but forced the Circassians themselves to pay. In some cases, Circassians were forced to sell their cattle or their belongings to pay; in others, one of every thirty Circassians were sold into slavery to pay. These funds ultimately ended up in the hands of the transporters, including Russian military officiers. Many vessels refused to carry Circassians because of the disease that was present among them as many of the ships that had been carrying Circassians had had their crews fall ill, while others that did agree tried to make as much profit out of it as possible by overloading their vessels with refugees, ultimately causing many transport boats to sink, killing their human cargo. In April 1864, after one Russian crew was entirely wiped out by disease, Russian vessels stopped offering themselves for transport, dumping the entire process onto the burden of the Ottomans; and Yevdokimov made no effort to make provisions for food, water or medical help.

The Russian consul based in the Ottoman Black Sea port of Trabzon reported the arrival of 240,000 Circassians with 19,000 dying shortly thereafter with the death rate being around 200 people per day.

On 25 May 1864, Henry Bulwer, the British ambassador in Istanbul, argued that the British government charter some of its own vessels for the purpose because the Ottomans simply did not have enough on their own, and innocent civilians would be left to rot; the vessels were not forthcoming but British government ships provided assistance at various points and British steamships also helped. On 29 May, eight Greek vessels were reported to be helping with the transportation of Circassians, as were one Moldavian, one German, and one British vessel.

Demographic changes 

Among the main peoples that moved to Turkey were Adyghe, Ubykhs, and Muslim Abkhazians – hence the reference in the name to the deportation being of Circassians. The Shapsugh tribe, which had numbered some 300,000, was reduced to the 3,000 people who managed to flee into the forests and plains. The 140 Shapsugh that remained were sent to Siberia. Overall, calculations including those taking into account the Russian government's own archival figures as well as Ottoman figures have estimated a loss of 90%, 94% or 95–97% of the Circassian nation in the process. One of the biggest population changes came in the Circassian capital city of Sochi, which previously had a population of around 100,000, and according to Russian sources, was reduced to 98 after the events.

Sources state that as many as 1 to 1.5 million Circassians were forced to flee in total, but only a half could make it to land. Ottoman archives show nearly 1 million migrants entering their land from the Caucasus by 1879, with nearly half of them dying on the shores as a result of diseases. If Ottoman archives are correct, it would make it the biggest genocide of the 19th century, and indeed, in support of the Ottoman archives, the Russian census of 1897 records only 150,000 Circassians, one tenth of the original number, still remaining in the now conquered region.

However, although Circassians were the main (and most notorious) victims, the expulsions also gravely affected other peoples in the region. It was estimated that 80% of the Ingush left Ingushetia for the Middle East in 1865. Lowland Chechens as well were evicted in large numbers, and while many came back, the former Chechen lowlands lacked their historical Chechen populations for a long period until Chechens were settled in the region during the return from their 1944–1957 deportation to Siberia. The Arshtins, at that time a (debatably) separate people, were completely wiped out as a distinct group: according to official documents, 1,366 Arshtin families disappeared (i.e. either fled or were killed) and only 75 families remained. Additionally, in 1860–1861 the Russian army forced a series of evictions of lands in the Central Caucasus, forcing about 10,000 Circassians, 22,000 Chechens and additionally a significant number of Muslim Ossetians out and to Turkey. Two other Muslim peoples in the northwest Caucasus, the Karachay and the Balkars, were not deported in large numbers during the process as they were loyal to Russia since the beginning. Abkhazia, meanwhile, lost 60% of its ethnic Abkhaz population by the end of the 19th century.

Whether sources treat the evictions of these non-Circassian peoples as a part of the same process varies; most sources include the evictions and massacres of the Ubykh (considered by many to be part of the Circassian ethnos despite having a different language) and Abazin populations as part of the same operation against the neighboring ethnic Circassian populations, and some sources also include the Abkhaz in counts of the evicted while others group the expulsions of Chechens, Ingush, Arshtins and Ossetians with those of Kabardins, and also some include the earlier and less systematic expulsions of Nogai. The 1861 order by Yevdokimov the relocate populations of Circassians (including Ubykhs) to the swamps also included the Nogais and Abazas.

Shenfield has argued that those that died in the ensuing catastrophe were probably more than a million, likely approaching 1.5 million.

Repopulation of affected lands 
On 25 June 1861, Tsar Alexander II signed an imperial rescript titled "Settlement of the North Caucasus", reading as follows:

To speed up the process, Alexander offered monetary compensation and various privileges. From the spring of 1861 to 1862, 35 Cossack stanitsas were established, with 5,480 families newly settling the land. In 1864, seventeen new Cossack stanitsas were established in the Transkuban region.

Analysis of the role of other Great Powers

Ottoman Empire 
With regard to Ottoman policy overall, Fabio Grassi argues that the Ottoman policy was quite successful with respect to the conditions at hand. He states that the Ottomans saw Circassians as fellow Muslims who were in hard times, but they could not do anything to help them. Rosser-Owen portrays the Ottomans as having been constrained by pragmatic concerns, at a loss for what to do about the flood of refugees, and notes the hardships suffered by British consular staff as they tried to help the Circassian refugees as well as the improvement of Ottoman policy toward accommodating the refugees over time so that by 1867 when the final Abkhaz refugees were transported, there were many fewer deaths in the process.

Others, however, disagree; historian Walter Richmond accuses the Ottoman government of "playing a double game", "gross irresponsibility" and being "either unconcerned with or oblivious to the consequences immigration would have for the refugees, by having at various points encouraged Circassian population movement", in its previous statements, having earlier encouraged immigration, urging the Circassians to "stay and fight" in late 1863 and promising the arrival of an international coalition force, and then encouraging another wave of immigration as late as June 1864 when the human costs were beyond clear, while Shenfield also describes the Ottoman response to the crisis as "grossly inadequate" and Marc Pinson accuses the Ottoman government of not trying to formulate a coherent policy toward the refugees.

United Kingdom 
Richmond also argues that the British, despite serious discussion of the possibility of military intervention to alleviate the situation in Circassia, have ultimately been concerned only with their own geopolitical interests and "deserting" Circassia to its fate. He further argues that Western European indignation at the unfolding situation in Circassia arose only after Russia leveraged the Ottomans to gain special rights in the Dardanelles thus threatening their trade interests. Albeit, Europeans were still ethnically cleansing in the American continent, the largest mass genocide event resulting in the deaths of 130 million indigenous people.

Scotland 
Rosser-Owen emphasizes that the philanthropic efforts of British organizations and that the concern for the well-being of Circassians was most intense in Scotland where Circassian struggles were compared to past traumas in then-recent Scottish history.

Lobbying and relief efforts 
In 1862, the Circassians sent a delegation of leaders to major cities in Britain, which had been covertly helping the Circassians with tactics and with organizing their resistance, visiting major English and Scottish cities including London, Manchester, Edinburgh and Dundee to advocate for their cause. The visits caused a swelling of public support for the Circassians and outrage directed at Russia, with sympathies particularly intense in Scotland perhaps owing to the recent Highland Clearances, and sparked lobbying for intervention by the Dundee Foreign Affairs Committee, calls to arms for the defense of Circassia, the founding of the Circassian Aid Committee in London, and constant reporting on the issue by various newspapers such as The Scotsman. Politicians and newspapers began taking up the "Circassian cause", and calling for intervention to save Circassia from decimation, and at one point Parliament came close to going to war with Russia and attempting to establish a protectorate over struggling Circassia. Although such initiatives failed to change British government policy, the Circassian Aid Committee, organized by many individuals who were angry at inaction by London, managed to gather £2,067 for the provision of mattresses, blankets, pillows, woolens and clothings especially for Circassian orphans in Istanbul, while Russophobic commentary by some of its members has been attributed for its closing in March 1865. British consuls became involved with relief patterns and the organization of resettlement for Circassians, with various British consuls and consular staff catching illnesses from plague-ridden Circassian refugees, and a few died from such illnesses.

In the initial stages of the process, relief efforts were also made by the Ottoman population, both by Muslims and Christians. In Vidin, in Bulgaria, the Muslim and Christian inhabitants volunteered to increase their grain production and send it to the local Circassian refugees, while in Cyprus, the Muslim population sheltered Circassian orphans. The Ottoman government built mosques for them and provided them with teachers, while the Sultan donated £50,000 from his Privy Purse, although there were some reports in the British press that most of this money did not actually end up helping Circassian refugees, having been embezzled by Ottoman officials at various steps along the way. As the burden of the refugees increased however, sentiments against the refugees, particularly among the Bulgarian and Turkish populations, grew and tensions began to develop between the Bulgarian and Turkish natives and the Circassian refugees.

Resettlement 

The Ottoman authorities often failed to offer any support to the newly arrived. They were settled in the inhospitable mountainous regions of Inner Anatolia and were given menial and exhausting jobs.

Imam Shamil's son Muhamed Shafi was appalled by the conditions the migrants had faced upon their arrival to Anatolia and went to investigate the situation: "I will write to (Turkish sultan) Abdülmecid that he should stop fooling mountaineers ... The government's cynicism could not be more pronounced. The Turks triggered the resettlement by their proclamations, probably hoping to use refugees for military ends ... but after facing the avalanche of refugees, they turned turtle and shamefully condemned to slow death those people who were ready to die for Turkey's glory".

In 1864 alone about 220,000 people disembarked in Anatolia. Between 6 March and 21 May 1864, the entire Ubykh nation had departed the Caucasus for Turkey, leading to the extinction of the Ubykh language in 1992. By the end of the movement, more than 400,000 Circassians, as well as 200,000 Abkhazians and Ajars, fled to Turkey. The term Çerkes, "Circassians", became the blanket term for them in Turkey because the majority were Circassians (Adyghe). Some other Circassian refugees fled to the border areas of the Danube Vilayet where Ottomans had expanded their military forces to defend the new province and some Circassians enrolled in military service while others settled in the region.

The Ottoman authorities often opted to settle Circassians in Christian-majority regions that were beginning to clamor for independence, as a loyal counterweight population to the rebellious natives. These places had just recently taken on large numbers of around a hundred thousand Crimean Tatar refugees, in a previous resettlement operation that had also seen widespread complications and problems. In Varna, it was reported that the situation was particularly bad, with 80,000 Circassians settled on the outskirts of the city in "camps of death" where they were unprotected from weather or disease and left without food. When Circassians tried to beg for bread, Turkish soldiers chased them out for fear of the diseases they carried. It was reported that the Turks were unable to keep up with burying Circassian corpses, and recruited convicts to do the work as well; one Circassian wrote to the Governor-General "We rather go to Siberia than live in this Siberia ... one can die, not live, on the indicated place".

Areas settled by Circassians

Balkans 

In 1861–1862 alone, in the Danube Vilayet, there were 41,000 Circassian refugee families. By the end of the process, there were around 250,000 Circassians in the Balkans, accounting for 5 to 7 percent of the total Balkan population, on top of the earlier arrival of 100,000 Crimean Tatars that Balkan populations had just recently had to absorb.

Kadir Natho notes that "a net of Circassian settlements enveloped practically all the European part of the Ottoman Empire". Very large numbers of Circassians were settled in Bulgaria. Istoria Bulgarii reports that "about 6,000 families were transferred through Burgas and settled in Thrace; 13,000 families – through Varna and Shumen – to Silistra and Vidin; 12,000 families to Sofia and Nish. The remainder 10,000 families were distributed in Svishtovsk, Nikipolsk, Oriskhovsk, and other outskirts." There was a chain of Circassian settlements stretching from Dobruja (see Circassians in Romania) to the Serbian border, with an additional cluster of 23 settlements in the Kosovo field. Circassians also settled in a few mostly Greek areas, particularly in the southern part of Epirus, Cyprus and one colony at Panderma in the Sea of Marmara.

Russians raped Circassian girls during the 1877 Russo-Turkish war from the Circassian refugees who were settled in the Ottoman Balkans. Circassian girls were sold into Turkish harems by their relatives. Circassians in the Ottoman army also raped and murdered Bulgarians during the 1877 Russo-Turkish war.

Anatolia and Iraq 

Kadir Natho lists the following areas as having notable concentrations of Circassian refugee settlements: "in spacious Anatolia ... near Amasya, Samsun, Cilicia, Mesopotamia, on the Charshamba peninsula, along the Aegean Sea, in Turkish Armenia, Adapazar, Duzge, Eskisehir, and Balikesir. From Trebizond the mountaineers were directly sent to Kars and Erzincan ... many exiles were distributed in ... the vilayet of Sivas, on the extensive desert between Tokat and Sivas".

Levant

Proposed return
Many Circassian households petitioned the Russian embassy in Constantinople for their resettlement back in the Caucasus. By the end of the century, the Russian consulates all over the Ottoman Empire were deluged with such petitions. Later, re-emigration was sanctioned only on a limited scale, as mostly large villages (up to 8,500 inhabitants) applied for re-emigration and their relocation posed formidable difficulties to the imperial authorities. Perhaps more importantly, Alexander II suspected that the British and Ottoman governments had instructed Circassians to seek return with the purpose of sparking a new war against their Russian overlords. As a consequence, he was known to personally decline such petitions.

Consequences

The overall resettlement was accompanied by hardships for the common people. A significant number died of starvation – many Turks of Adyghe descent still do not eat fish today, in memory of the tremendous number of their kinfolk that they lost during the passage across the Black Sea.

Some of the deportees and their descendants did well and they would eventually earn high positions within the Ottoman Empire. A significant number of Young Turks had Caucasian origins.

All nationals of Turkey are considered Turkish for official purposes. However, there are several hundred villages which are considered purely "Circassian", whose total "Circassian" population is estimated to be 1,000,000, although there is no official data in this respect, and the estimates are based on informal surveys. The "Circassians" in question may not always speak the languages of their ancestors, and Turkey's center-right parties, often with varying tones of Turkish nationalism, generally do well in localities where they are known to constitute sizable parts of the population (such as in Akyazı).

Along with Turkey's aspirations to join the European Union, population groups with specificities started receiving more attention on the basis of their ethnicity or culture.

In Middle Eastern countries, which were created from the dismembered Ottoman Empire (and were initially under an Allied protectorate), the fate of the ethnos was better. The Al Jeish al Arabi (Arab Legion), created in Trans-Jordan under the influence of Lawrence of Arabia, in significant part consisted of Chechens – arguably because the Bedouin were reluctant to serve under the centralized command. In addition, the modern city of Amman was born after Circassians settled there in 1887.

Apart from substantial numbers of Kabardian Circassians consisting of qalang tribes, small communities of mountainous Circassians (nang tribes) remained in their original homeland under Russian rule that were separated from among one another within an area heavily resettled by Russian Cossacks, Slavs and other settlers. For example, the capital of the Shapsugh tribe was renamed after the Russian general that committed atrocities in the region along with the erection of a victory statue to him. In the Caucusus, some 217,000 Circassians remained in 1897.

Ethnic tensions in the Ottoman Empire
 

Misha Glenny notes that the settlement of the Circassian deportees played a major role in destabilizing the Ottoman Balkans, especially Bulgaria. Their arrival helped spread starvation and epidemics (including smallpox) in the Balkan territories, and worse, the Porte ordered that Christians be evicted en masse from their homes in certain areas in order to accommodate the need to house the deportees. This, and the outbreak of armed conflict between the Circassians and the Christian and Muslim natives, accelerated the growth of nationalist sentiments in the Balkans. Kadir Natho argues that the Ottomans coopted the Circassians into a "police force" in the Balkans as well as for settling them to increase the local Muslim population, with Circassians being made to take arms against rebellions, even those Circassians that had not settled in affected regions. The local Balkan peoples, having just taken on large numbers of Crimean Tatar refugees, an operation which had caused the deaths of thousands of refugees and natives alike due to disease and starvation, were sometimes loath to take in more Muslim refugees expelled by the Russians, and some Bulgarians, in particular, were convinced that Circassians had been placed into scattered Bulgarian villages "in order to paralyze any kind of liberation and independence Slavic movement". While in many areas, Bulgarian Christians had initially been very hospitable to the Circassian refugees, including by producing extra resources to support them, the collapsing humanitarian situation combined with the political instability caused relations between the two groups to spiral downward.

In many cases, lands were assigned to North Caucasian refugees by the Ottoman government, but the locals refused to give up their homes, causing outbreaks of fighting between Circassians and Chechens on one side, and the Bulgarian, Serbian, Arab, Bedouin, Druze, Armenian, Turkish and Kurdish natives on the other, leading to armed conflict. In Uzun Aile, between Kayseri and Sivas, Circassians ultimately pushed the local Kurdish population out, and to this day the Kurds with roots in that region recall in a folk song how a "cruel fair-haired and blue-eyed people with sheep-skin hats" drove them from their homes.

Traumatized, desperate, and having lived for many decades previously in a situation where Circassians and Russians would regularly raid each other, Circassians sometimes resorted to raiding the native populations, ultimately causing a reputation for the Circassians as being particularly barbaric to spread throughout the Empire.

Eventually, fear of the Circassians, due to the diseases they spread and the stereotype of them as either beggars or bandits, became so great that Christian and Muslim communities alike would protest upon hearing that Circassians were to be settled near them.

Later, in the 1870s, war again struck in the Balkans where most Circassians had made their homes, and they were deported by Russian and Russian-allied forces a second time.

Numbers of refugees 
Alan Fisher notes that accurate counts of the refugees were difficult to impossible to obtain because "Most of those leaving the Caucasus did it in a hurry,
in a disorganised fashion, without passing any official border point where they might have been counted or officially noted", however estimates have been made primarily based on the available documents including Russian archival documents as well as Ottoman documents.

1852–1858: Abkhaz population declined from 98,000 to 89,866
1858–1860: Over 30,000 Nogais left
1860–1861: 10,000 Kabardians left
1861–1863: 4,300 Abaza, 4,000 Natukhais, 2,000 Temirgoi, 600 Beslenei, and 300 Bzhedugs families were exiled
by 1864: 600,000 Circassians have left for the Ottoman Empire, with more leaving afterwards
1865: 5,000 Chechen families were sent to Turkey
1863–1864: 470,703 people left the West Caucasus (according to G. A. Dzidzariia)
1863–1864: 312,000 people left the West Caucasus (according to N. G. Volkova)
Between November 1863 and August 1864: over 300,000 Circassians seek refuge in the Ottoman Empire; over two thirds die.
1858–1864: 398,000 people left the Kuban oblast (according to N. G. Volkova)
1858–1864: 493,194 people left (according to Adol'f Berzhe)
1863–1864: 400,000 people left (according to N. I. Voronov)
1861–1864: 418,000 people left (according to the Main Staff of the Caucasus Army)

Genocide classification 
In recent times, scholars and Circassian activists have proposed that the deportations and mass killings can certainly be considered as a manifestation of the modern-day concept of genocide, though the term had not been in use in the 19th century. Noting the systematic massacre of villages by Russian soldiers that was accompanied by the Russian colonization of these lands, Circassian activists claim it is "certainly and undeniably" a genocide. Scholars estimate that some 90 percent of Circassians (estimated at more than one million) had vanished from the territories occupied by Russia. During these events, at least hundreds of thousands of people were "killed or starved to death".

Political positions

Russia 
In Russia, a presidential commission has been set up to try and deny the Circassian genocide, with respect to the events of the 1860s. There is concern by the Russian government that acknowledging the events as genocide would entail possible claims of financial compensation in addition to efforts toward repatriating diaspora Circassians back to Circassia.

Boris Yeltsin 
Former Russian President Boris Yeltsin's May 1994 statement stated that Circassian resistance to the Tsarist forces was legitimate, and that there were sad casualties, but he did not recognize "the guilt of the tsarist government for the genocide".

Circassian Organizations 
In 1997 and 1998, the leaders of Kabardino-Balkaria and Adygea sent appeals to the Duma to reconsider the situation and to issue an apology; to date, there has been no response from Moscow. In October 2006, the Adygeyan public organizations of Russia, Turkey, Israel, Jordan, Syria, the United States, Belgium, Canada, and Germany have sent the president of the European Parliament a letter with the request to recognize the genocide against Adygean (Circassian) people.

On 5 July 2005, the Circassian Congress, an organization that unites representatives of the various Circassian peoples in the Russian Federation, has called on Moscow first to acknowledge and then to apologize for tsarist policies that Circassians say constituted a genocide. Their appeal pointed out that "according to the official tsarist documents more than 400,000 Circassians were killed, 497,000 were forced to flee abroad to Turkey, and only 80,000 were left alive in their native area." The Russian parliament (Duma) rejected the petition in 2006 in a statement that acknowledged past actions of the Soviet and previous regimes while referring to in overcoming multiple contemporary problems and issues in the Caucasus through cooperation.

Georgia 
On 21 May 2011, the Parliament of Georgia passed a resolution, stating that pre-planned mass killings of Circassians by Imperial Russia, accompanied by "deliberate famine and epidemics", should be recognized as "genocide" and those deported during those events from their homeland, should be recognized as "refugees". Georgia has made outreach efforts to North Caucasian ethnic groups since the 2008 Russo-Georgian War. Following a consultation with academics, human rights activists and Circassian diaspora groups and parliamentary discussions in Tbilisi in 2010 and 2011, Georgia became the first country to use the word "genocide" to refer to the events. On 20 May 2011 the parliament of the Republic of Georgia declared in its resolution that the mass annihilation of the Cherkess (Adyghe) people during the Russian-Caucasian war and thereafter constituted genocide as defined in the Hague Convention of 1907 and the UN Convention of 1948. The next year, on the same day of 21 May, a monument was erected in Anaklia, Georgia, to commemorate the suffering of the Circassians.

Turkey 

Circassians in Turkey have made multiple attempts to get Turkey to recognize the genocide. There are multiple monuments in Turkey erected to commemorate the Circassian genocide. Turkish politicians have referenced the events multiple times. Every year on 21 May, Turkish politicians and major political parties post Tweets commemorating the events, while referring to it as an "exile", including Recep Tayyip Erdoğan. Some political parties such as the Pluralist Democracy Party (ÇDP), Labour Party (EMEP) and Peoples' Democratic Party (HDP) have called on Turkey to recognize the genocide.

Appeals to world governments by Circassians 
On 1 December 2015, in the Great Union Day (the national day of Romania), a large number of Circassian representatives sent a request to the Romanian government asking it to recognize the Circassian genocide. The letter was specifically sent to the President (Klaus Iohannis), the Prime Minister (Dacian Cioloș), the President of the Senate (Călin Popescu-Tăriceanu) and the President of the Chamber of Deputies (Valeriu Zgonea). The document included 239 signatures and was written in Arabic, English, Romanian and Turkish. Similar requests had already been sent earlier by Circassian representatives to Estonia, Lithuania, Moldova, Poland and Ukraine. In the case of Moldova, the request was sent on 27 August of the same year (2015), on the Moldovan Independence Day, to the President (Nicolae Timofti), the Prime Minister (Valeriu Streleț) and the President of the Parliament (Andrian Candu). The request was also redacted in Arabic, English, Romanian and Turkish languages and included 192 signatures.

Scholarly viewpoints 

Most scholars today agree that the term "genocide" is justified to define the events, except some Russian scholars in the minority. Some scholarly views include:

Commemoration

Notes

See also 
 Circassians
 Russo-Circassian War
 Persecution of Muslims
 Circassian diaspora
 Deportation of the Chechens and Ingush
 List of genocides by death toll

References

Sources

Further reading 
 
 
 
 

1864 establishments in the Russian Empire
1867 disestablishments in the Russian Empire
1860s in the Russian Empire
Circassians
Demographics of the Ottoman Empire
Demographics of Russia
Ethnic cleansing in Europe
Russian Empire
Peoples of the Caucasus
1860s in the Ottoman Empire
History of Turkey
History of Abkhazia
History of Ingushetia
History of Chechnya
History of Kuban
Genocide of indigenous peoples
Genocides in Europe
Anti-Muslim violence in Europe
Genocidal rape
19th-century murders in Europe
19th-century murders in Asia
19th-century massacres
19th-century mass murder
Murder in the Russian Empire
Imperial Russian war crimes
19th-century murders in the Russian Empire